David Paul FLS (1845–1929) was a Scottish minister and botanist who served as Moderator of the General Assembly of the Church of Scotland in 1915.

Life

David Paul was born on 28 August 1845 in Banchory in Aberdeenshire, the son of Rev Dr William Paul DD (1804-1884) minister of Banchory-Devenick and his wife, Jessy Stewart.

He was educated at Banchory-Devenick school then studied first at Aberdeen University then Edinburgh University.

Paul was licensed to preach as a Church of Scotland minister by the Presbytery of Aberdeen 1868 and became assistant in Udny.   In 1869 he took brief charge of the Scots Church in the east of Dresden in Germany before returning to Scotland when ordained as minister of Morebattle later in the same year. He translated to Roxburgh in 1876.

From 1896 Paul was minister of the Robertson Memorial Church in the Grange (renamed Grange Church in 1929 and now known as Marchmont-St Giles) replacing Rev William Lyon Riach. He lived at 53 Fountainhall Road, a large villa in the Grange.

From 1899 to 1901 he was President of the Edinburgh Botanical Society.

He was principal clerk of the General Assembly of the Church of Scotland from 1912 to 1926, serving as Moderator in 1915.

Paul died on 12 July 1929. He is buried, with his family, in Grange Cemetery in south Edinburgh close to his home and his church. The grave lies on the southern boundary wall, towards the south-east corner wall.

Family

In 1876 he was married to Katharine Kinloch (1850-1913) daughter of Alexander John Kinloch of Park and Altries. They had several children:

Alexander John Kinloch Paul (b.1877)
Katherine Ethel Paul (b.1878)
Alice Mary Paul (b.1880)
David Hutcheon Paul (b.1883)
George Morison Paul (b.1884)

References

1845 births
1929 deaths
People from Aberdeenshire
Alumni of the University of Aberdeen
Moderators of the General Assembly of the Church of Scotland
Scottish botanists
19th-century Ministers of the Church of Scotland
20th-century Ministers of the Church of Scotland